"I'm Gonna Take That Mountain" is a song written by Jerry Salley and Melissa Peirce, and recorded by American country music artist Reba McEntire.  It was released in August 2003 as the first single from the album Room to Breathe.  The song reached number 14 on the Billboard Hot Country Singles & Tracks chart.

Music video
The video for this song was directed by Nancy Bardawil, and was filmed in a rural area of Gatlinburg, TN. It features Reba performing the song against a mountain backdrop, and rodeo performers showing off rope and horse tricks. Reba is also seen singing and dancing on a wood dance floor with a cactus prop, accompanied by 4 backup dancers. These are the same dancers who starred on Broadway with Reba in "Annie Get Your Gun." Reba considers this as one of her favorite videos, and called it "a total blast" to make.

Chart performance

References

2003 singles
Reba McEntire songs
Song recordings produced by Buddy Cannon
Song recordings produced by Norro Wilson
Songs written by Melissa Peirce
Songs written by Jerry Salley
MCA Nashville Records singles
2003 songs
MCA Records singles
Songs about mountains